An Unfortunate Woman: A Journey is Richard Brautigan's eleventh and final published novel. Written in 1982, it was first published (posthumously) in 1994 in a French translation, Cahier d'un Retour de Troie ["Diary of a Return from Troy"]. The first edition in English did not appear until 2000, when it was produced by St. Martin's Press.

An Unfortunate Woman assumes the form of a traveler's journal, chronicling the protagonist's journey and his oblique ruminations on the suicide of one woman and the death from cancer of a close friend.

External links
 Entry on brautigan.net

1994 American novels
American novellas
Novels by Richard Brautigan
Novels published posthumously
Fiction set in 1982